In immunology, a paratope, also known as an antigen-binding site, is the part of an antibody which recognizes and binds to an antigen. It is a small region at the tip of the antibody's antigen-binding fragment and contains parts of the antibody's heavy and light chains. Each paratope is made up of six complementarity-determining regions - three from each of the light and heavy chains - that extend from a fold of anti-parallel beta sheets. Each arm of the Y-shaped antibody has an identical paratope at the end.

Paratopes make up the parts of the B-cell receptor that bind to and make contact with the epitope of an antigen. All the B-cell receptors on one B cell have identical paratopes. The uniqueness of a paratope allows it to bind to only one epitope with high affinity and as a result, each B cell can only respond to one epitope. The paratopes on B-cell receptors binding to their specific epitope is a critical step in the adaptive immune response.

Design of paratopes between species
The design and structure of paratopes can differ greatly between different species. In jawed-vertebrates, V(D)J recombination can result in billions of different paratopes. The number of paratopes, however, is limited by the composition of the V, D, and J genes and the structure of the antibody. Thus, many different species have developed ways to bypass this restriction and increase the diversity of possible paratopes.

In cows, an extra-long complementarity-determining region is considered to have an essential role in diversifying paratopes. Additionally, both chickens and rabbits use gene conversion to increase the number of paratopes that are possible.

References 

Immune system